Mohamed Ahmed-Chamanga, is a Comorian linguistic, writer, researcher, politic and professor born in Ouani (Nzwani) in 1952.

He has worked mainly to make known his Comorian culture and in 2006 he was candidate for his country presidential election.

After his secondary studies, he graduated in Swahili and Arabic language and travelled to Madagascar and France where he made studies in linguistics. He created in 1976 a method to transcript Shikomori, and started writing articles about this language. He later published his thesis "Le Shindzuani (Comores) : Phonologie, morphologie, lexique" (1991) and has written many articles about Shikomori and transcribed Comorian tales.

He's currently teacher of Comorian at the Institut National des Langues et Civilisations Orientales (INALCO) in Paris, collaborator of Centre National de Documentation et de Recherche Scientifique (CNDRS, Moroni y Ouani) and professor at the University of Comoros since its creation.

References

Bibliography 
 Dictionnaire français-comorien
 Lexique comorien (shindzuani)-français
 Contes comoriens de Ngazidja

External links 
 Mohamed Ahmed-Chamanga: BiblioMonde
 Bibliographie
 Mohamed Ahmed-Chamanga candidat à l'élection présidentielle de 2006
 Site de l'INALCO
 L'Université des Comores

1952 births
Living people
Comorian politicians
Comorian writers
People from Anjouan